Elmer E. Haight (April 1, 1861 – February 11, 1934) was an American businessman, farmer, and politician.

Haight was born in the town of Empire, Fond du Lac County, Wisconsin, the son of James H. Haight and Caroline Haight. Haight moved with his parents to Fond du Lac, Wisconsin where he went to Fond du Lac High School. Haight then moved to Lowville, Columbia County, Wisconsin in 1876 and was a farmer. He married Stella E. Scott (1866–1907). In 1909 and 1911, Haight served in the Wisconsin State Assembly and was a Republican. Haight moved to  Poynette, Wisconsin around 1917, where he had a hardware and cold storage business. Haight was serving as postmaster for Poynette when he died. He died at  his home in Poynette, Wisconsin after a short illness.

References

External links

1861 births
1934 deaths
People from Columbia County, Wisconsin
People from Empire, Wisconsin
Businesspeople from Wisconsin
Farmers from Wisconsin
Wisconsin postmasters
People from Poynette, Wisconsin
People from Fond du Lac, Wisconsin
Republican Party members of the Wisconsin State Assembly